Vanaspati (Devanāgari: , Sanskrit for "lord of the forest") is primarily a term for a large fruit-bearing tree, especially a fig-tree. It may also refer to:
the plant kingdom in general, see Vanaspati
a sacrificial post in Vedic ritual, see  historical Vedic religion
a name of Soma
a name of Kīrtimukha
a Carnatic raga, see Vanaspati (Raga)
 Dalda - also known as Vanaspati ghee, is a type of shortening or hydrogenated vegetable fat